James Tillis (born July 5, 1957) is an American former professional boxer and actor. Known as "Quick", he was known for his remarkably fast hand speed for a man of his size and build. A natural southpaw, Tillis turned around to orthodox midway in his amateur career. His left remained the stronger hand and for that reason, he had a powerful jab and left hook, together with the ability to switch stances while fighting. Tillis challenged for the WBA world heavyweight title in 1981, but was defeated in a fifteen round unanimous decision fight against Mike Weaver. Tillis was the first man to go the distance with Mike Tyson in 1986, breaking his knockout-streak and giving him a relatively close fight, nearly a draw, with two of three judges scoring the fight . (in the words of Hall of Fame's Gil Clancy, Tillis was "one punch" away from victory.) He holds notable wins over Ron Stander by TKO in the 7th round in 1980, and the hard punching Earnie Shavers by ten-round decision in 1982. Tillis fought for the last time in 2001 at the age of 44.

Early years
A native of Tulsa, Oklahoma, he was the firstborn son of James Tillis and wife Rose. Tillis attended Mclain High School and grew up in a very religious southern family, with an alcoholic father and a deeply religious mother. His mother would later join First Baptist Mohawk Church under the leadership of Pastor Clint Simmons. He dreamed about being a professional prize fighter and was given the nickname "Quick" by his first cousin Keith Reed.

Amateur career
"Quick" was influenced to begin training to become a boxer after he listened to the 1964 bout between Muhammad Ali and Sonny Liston on the radio. He enlisted the help of noted trainer Ed Duncan, by becoming involved in the sport at the O'Brien Park recreation center in north Tulsa. Tillis' amateur record of 92–8 led to his being considered for the United States Olympic team. Due to an illness, he was unable to compete in the Olympic trials.

However, his impressive amateur career included three state Golden Gloves and four state AAU titles. He lost to future pro opponent Greg Page at the 1976 National Golden Gloves, and to Charles Singleton at the 1978 National Golden Gloves in Albuquerque, New Mexico. At the 1977 USA–USSR Duals in Milwaukee, Wisconsin, he lost on points to the Soviet light heavyweight David Kvachadze. He also managed to beat future pro contender Renaldo Snipes, who he later turned pro with on the same card in 1978.

Professional career
Tillis began his professional boxing career in 1978, with a first-round knockout of Ron Stephany. He won his first 20 fights with 16 knockouts. One of his most impressive early victories was a seventh-round knockout of Ron Stander in 1980. Stander had once challenged Joe Frazier for the world title and was regarded as one of boxing's most durable fighters. Other notable wins included a knockout of the South American champion Domingo D'Elia, and a points win over the sometimes dangerous fringe contender Mike Koranicki. His co-managers were Beau Williford and Gary Bentley.

Title fight
In 1981, Tillis fought "Hercules" Mike Weaver for the WBA World Heavyweight title. After a strong start, Tillis tired. The fight would become famous for trainer Angelo Dundee imploring Tillis to do something, asking the fighter, "Do you want to be a bum all your life?" Ultimately, Tillis lost a close points decision.

In June 1982, Tillis came off the floor to outpoint the hard-hitting legend Earnie Shavers.  He blew that momentum only a few months later, being upset by undefeated contender Pinklon Thomas, who was a late substitute, via an 8th round knockout loss. In November 1982, Tillis fought former amateur rival Greg Page for the USBA Heavyweight title. He knocked Page down in the 2nd round, but again tired and was the victim of another eighth-round knockout loss. Thomas and Page would go on to win different versions of the world title.

Downward spiral
Having scored four wins, Tillis challenged future two-time world champion Tim Witherspoon in September 1983, for the vacant North American Boxing Federation title.  Tillis was shockingly bombed out in one round, apparently slipping on a wet spot in the ring as Witherspoon hit him. After the fight, Tillis' trainer Angelo Dundee left him and advised him to retire, as he had just suffered his third defeat in thirteen months.

Tillis got a new team and put together four wins in 1984, before challenging Carl Williams in a world title eliminator. Having decked Williams twice in the opening round, Tillis tired and was outpointed. In 1985, under the guidance of trainer Drew Bundini Brown, he fought Joe Frazier's son and top contender Marvis Frazier. In a recurring theme, he had Frazier down in the second round, but again ran out of gas and was outpointed. A few months later, he traveled to South Africa to fight hard-hitting ex-champ Gerrie Coetzee. Tillis lost a unanimous decision, but sent Coetzee to hospital with stitches and missing teeth.

Stamina issue
After extensive medical examination, Tillis' strange recurrent fatigue midway through fights was found to derive from a severe allergy to the classic fighter's diet of milk and eggs. A doctor provided Tillis with a more suitable diet, in the training for his upcoming fight with Mike Tyson, a red-hot prospect with a 19–0 (19 knockouts) record. Tillis appeared to be a new man, as he exchanged with Tyson and gave the future two-time champion a very tough fight. Although ultimately outpointed, he was the first person ever to take Iron Mike to the distance. Surprisingly, Tillis' heart and will to fight has been questioned quite frequently by boxing analysts, even his co-manager Beau Williford told to the press the night before the fight considering that James was on a three-times-in-a-row losing streak, that his professional career as a boxer would be ended most likely if stopped by Tyson. Trainer Angelo Dundee, who worked with Tillis for the Weaver fight and some subsequent fights, finally gave up his job, he said: "James had no spirit to fight." In the pre-fight interview he told the ESPN staff that he found that spirit. To prove Dundee was wrong, Tillis violated almost all the Dundee "No-Nos" in the Tyson fight:
 Fought out of the squared-up stance, instead of the closed sideway stance.
 Sometimes fought with both hands down.
 Switched to southpaw and back to orthodox.
 Lead with his right hand.
 "Left-hooked with a hooker."
 Got tangled in wild exchanges.
Culminative moment of the fight came at 2:45 of the fourth round, when Tillis charged at Tyson with a leaping left hook, missed, and went off-balanced while pivoting on his left foot. Tyson slipped the punch and promptly switched to orthodox, throwing a leaping left hook of his own that landed right to the Tillis' chin, Tillis went down immediately. Tillis got up quickly at the count of "Two." That was the only knockdown during the entire fight, it cost Tillis a point, and subsequently a round on all the three judges' scorecards, and eventually the fight, which otherwise would have been ended a draw.

Initially, the crowd was rooting for Tyson, but in the later rounds it turned somewhat against Tyson due to him being unable to knock Tillis out, and after the ring announcer Paul LeFlore announced the judges' decision, pronouncing Tyson as the winner by a unanimous decision, the crowd booed wildly when referee Joe Cortez raised Tyson's hand. Being interviewed by the ABC Sports Network staff, Tyson himself said he just "fought a guy who was up for this fight, in the greatest shape in his life."

The new Tillis was short-lived, however, as he traveled to Australia and lost a decision to veteran Joe Bugner. In 1987, he was upset in eight rounds, as underdog (and regular Tyson sparring partner) Michael Williams came off the floor to stop Tillis. Later in the same year, he was stopped in five rounds on cuts by future champ Frank Bruno in London, and then knocked out in 10 rounds by hard-hitting Johnny DuPlooy in South Africa.

Having failed to secure a rematch with Tyson in 1988, this time for the undisputed heavyweight championship, he made one last attempt at the big time.  Tillis was brought in to fight reigning cruiserweight world champion Evander Holyfield, who was making a high-profile move into the heavyweight ranks. Holyfield outpunched Tillis in five one-sided rounds.

Tillis resurfaced in 1991. However, his days even as a journeyman appeared over, as hard-hitting (and future WBO World Champion) Tommy Morrison stopped him out in one round.

Semi-retirement
Tillis fought on and off until 2001. Although he still was able to outpoint former top-flight amateur Craig Payne, a 39-year-old Tillis was stopped in six rounds by Cliff Couser in 1996.

Tillis fought his last fight in 2001, losing to clubfighter Rob Calloway when he was 44 years old.

Professional boxing record

|-
|align="center" colspan=8|42 Wins (31 knockouts, 11 decisions), 22 Losses (11 knockouts, 11 decisions), 1 Draw, 1 No Contest 
|-
| align="center" style="border-style: none none solid solid; background: #e3e3e3"|Result
| align="center" style="border-style: none none solid solid; background: #e3e3e3"|Record
| align="center" style="border-style: none none solid solid; background: #e3e3e3"|Opponent
| align="center" style="border-style: none none solid solid; background: #e3e3e3"|Type
| align="center" style="border-style: none none solid solid; background: #e3e3e3"|Round
| align="center" style="border-style: none none solid solid; background: #e3e3e3"|Date
| align="center" style="border-style: none none solid solid; background: #e3e3e3"|Location
| align="center" style="border-style: none none solid solid; background: #e3e3e3"|Notes
|-align=center
|Loss
|42–22–1 
|align=left| Rob Calloway
|TKO
|9
|Apr 13, 2001
|align=left| Saint Joseph Civic Center, Saint Joseph, Missouri, U.S.
|
|-
|Loss
|42–21–1 
|align=left| Tim Puller
|UD
|10
|Oct 16, 1999
|align=left| Issaquah, Washington, U.S.
|
|-
|Loss
|42–20–1 
|align=left| Cliff Couser
|TKO
|6
|Aug 30, 1996
|align=left| Quay Centennial Building, Vancouver, Washington, U.S.
|
|-
|Win
|42–19–1 
|align=left| Craig Payne
|UD
|8
|Jun 21, 1996
|align=left| Quay Centennial Building, Vancouver, Washington, U.S.
|
|-
|style="background:#ddd;"|NC
|41–19–1 
|align=left| Will Hinton
|NC
|3
|Dec 7, 1995
|align=left| Denver, Colorado, U.S.
|
|-
|Loss
|41–19–1
|align=left| Alexander Zolkin
|UD
|10
|Oct 8, 1995
|align=left| Columbus, Ohio, U.S.
|
|-
|Win
|41–18–1
|align=left| Stan White Johnson
|TKO
|3
|Feb 28, 1992
|align=left| Union Hall, Countryside, Countryside, Illinois, U.S.
|
|-
|Win
|40–18–1
|align=left| Danny Blake
|SD
|10
|Nov 22, 1991
|align=left| Peoria, Illinois, U.S.
|
|-
|Loss
|39–18–1
|align=left| Tommy Morrison
|TKO
|1
|Jan 11, 1991
|align=left| Trump Taj Mahal, Atlantic City, New Jersey, U.S.
|
|-
|Win
|39–17–1
|align=left| Carlton West
|TKO
|3
|Dec 7, 1990
|align=left| Valley Sports Arena, Roanoke, Virginia, U.S.
|
|-
|Loss
|38–17–1
|align=left| Adilson Rodrigues
|UD
|10
|Mar 20, 1989
|align=left| Toledo, Parana, Brazil
|
|-
|Loss
|38–16–1
|align=left| Arthel Lawhorne
|UD
|10
|Jan 14, 1989
|align=left| The Palace of Auburn Hills, Auburn Hills, Michigan, U.S.
|
|-
|Loss
|38–15–1
|align=left| Gary Mason
|TKO
|5
|Nov 30, 1988
|align=left| Elephant and Castle Shopping Centre, Southwark, England
|
|-
|Loss
|38–14–1
|align=left| Evander Holyfield
|RTD
|5
|Jul 16, 1988
|align=left| Caesars Tahoe, Stateline, Nevada, U.S.
|
|-
|Win
|38–13–1
|align=left| Rodney Smith
|KO
|2
|Apr 9, 1988
|align=left| Caesars Palace, Paradise, Nevada, U.S.
|
|-
|Win
|37–13–1
|align=left| Dennis Jackson
|KO
|5
|Oct 16, 1987
|align=left| Boardwalk Hall, Atlantic City, New Jersey, U.S.
|
|-
|Loss
|36–13–1
|align=left| Johnny DuPlooy
|TKO
|10
|Jun 23, 1987
|align=left| Ellis Park Indoor Arena, Johannesburg, South Africa
|
|-
|Loss
|36–12–1
|align=left| Frank Bruno
|TKO
|5
|Mar 24, 1987
|align=left| Wembley Arena, London, England
|align=left|
|-
|Win
|36–11–1
|align=left| Ronnie Douglas
|TKO
|5
|Mar 6, 1987
|align=left| Fort Smith, Arkansas, U.S.
|align=left|
|-
|Loss
|35–11–1
|align=left| Mike Williams
|TKO
|8
|Jan 8, 1987
|align=left| Marriott Brookhollow, Houston, Texas, U.S.
|
|- align=center
|style="background: #c5d2ea"|Draw
|35–10–1
|align=left| Avery Rawls
|PTS
|align=left|10
|Nov 11, 1986
|align=left| Showboat Hotel and Casino, Las Vegas, Nevada, U.S.
|
|-
|Win
|35–10
|align=left| Lorenzo Boyd
|KO
|3
|Oct 28, 1986
|align=left| Station Square, Pittsburgh, Pennsylvania, U.S.
|align=left|
|-
|Win
|34–10
|align=left| Eddie Richardson
|PTS
|10
|Oct 18, 1986
|align=left| Mesquite, Texas, U.S.
|align=left|
|-
|Loss
|33–10
|align=left| Joe Bugner
|PTS
|10
|Sep 15, 1986
|align=left| Sydney Entertainment Centre, Sydney, Australia
|align=left|
|-
|Win
|33–9
|align=left| Art Terry
|UD
|8
|Jul 29, 1986
|align=left| Continental Inn, Lexington, Kentucky, U.S.
|align=left|
|-
|Win
|32–9
|align=left| Mark Young
|KO
|8
|Jun 17, 1986
|align=left| Tulsa, Oklahoma, U.S.
|align=left|
|-
|Loss
|31–9
|align=left| Mike Tyson
|UD
|10
|May 3, 1986
|align=left| Glens Falls Civic Center, Glens Falls, New York, U.S.
|align=left|
|-
|Loss
|31–8
|align=left| Tyrell Biggs
|UD
|8
|Jan 25, 1986
|align=left| Americana Host Farm, Lancaster, Pennsylvania, U.S.
|align=left|
|-
|Loss
|31–7
|align=left| Gerrie Coetzee
|UD
|10
|Sep 7, 1985
|align=left| Ellis Park Stadium, Johannesburg, South Africa
|align=left|
|-
|Loss
|31–6
|align=left| Marvis Frazier
|UD
|10
|May 20, 1985
|align=left| Lawlor Events Center, Reno, Nevada, U.S.
|align=left|
|-
|Win
|31–5
|align=left| Bashir Wadud
|UD
|10
|Dec 15, 1984
|align=left| Genesee Theatre, Waukegan, Illinois, U.S.
|align=left|
|-
|Loss
|30–5
|align=left|  Carl Williams
|UD
|10
|Oct 23, 1984
|align=left| Atlantis Hotel and Casino, Atlantic City, New Jersey, U.S.
|align=left|
|-
|Win
|30–4
|align=left| Michael Bennett
|KO
|1
|Aug 20, 1984
|align=left| Miami, Oklahoma, U.S.
|align=left|
|-
|Win
|29–4
|align=left| Billy Joe Thomas
|KO
|3
|Jul 10, 1984
|align=left| Tulsa, Oklahoma, U.S.
|align=left|
|-
|Win
|28–4
|align=left| Bobby Crabtree
|KO
|3
|Apr 26, 1984
|align=left| Excelsior Hotel, Tulsa, Oklahoma, U.S.
|align=left|
|-
|Win
|27–4
|align=left| Otis Bates
|KO
|2
|Feb 9, 1984
|align=left| Tulsa, Oklahoma, U.S.
|align=left|
|-
|Loss
|26–4
|align=left| Tim Witherspoon
|TKO
|1
|Sep 23, 1983
|align=left| Richfield Coliseum, Richfield, Ohio, U.S.
|align=left|
|-
|Win
|26–3
|align=left| Lynwood Jones
|KO
|4
|Jul 9, 1983
|align=left| DiVinci Manor, Chicago, Illinois, U.S.
|align=left|
|-
|Win
|25–3
|align=left| Larry Givens
|TKO
|2
|May 22, 1983
|align=left| Chicago, Illinois, U.S.
|align=left|
|-
|Win
|24–3
|align=left| Grady Daniels
|TKO
|4
|Apr 25, 1983
|align=left| Congress Americana Hotel, Chicago, Illinois, U.S.
|align=left|
|-
|Win
|23–3
|align=left| Leroy Boone
|PTS
|10
|Mar 28, 1983
|align=left| Congress Americana Hotel, Chicago, Illinois, U.S.
|align=left|
|-
|Loss
|22–3
|align=left| Greg Page
|TKO
|8
|Nov 26, 1982
|align=left| Astrodome, Houston, Texas, U.S.
|align=left|
|-
|Loss
|22–2
|align=left| Pinklon Thomas
|TKO
|8
|Aug 14, 1982
|align=left| Stouffer's Ballroom, Cleveland, Ohio, U.S.
|align=left|
|-
|Win
|22–1
|align=left| Earnie Shavers
|UD
|10
|Jun 11, 1982
|align=left| Caesars Palace, Paradise, Nevada, U.S.
|align=left|
|-
|Win
|21–1
|align=left| Jerry Williams
|KO
|3
|Mar 13, 1982
|align=left| Sands Hotel, Paradise, Nevada, U.S.
|align=left|
|-
|Loss
|20–1
|align=left| Mike Weaver
|UD
|15
|Oct 3, 1981
|align=left| Rosemont Horizon, Rosemont, Illinois, U.S.
|style="text-align:left;"|
|-
|Win
|20–0
|align=left| Tom Fischer
|PTS
|10
|Mar 9, 1981
|align=left| Hilton Chicago, Chicago, Illinois, U.S.
|align=left|
|-
|Win
|19–0
|align=left| Domingo D'Elia
|TKO
|4
|Nov 13, 1980
|align=left| International Amphitheatre, Chicago, Illinois, U.S.
|align=left|
|-
|Win
|18–0
|align=left| Mike Koranicki
|UD
|10
|Aug 14, 1980
|align=left| International Amphitheatre, Chicago, Illinois, U.S.
|align=left|
|-
|Win
|17–0
|align=left| Eric Sedillo
|TKO
|4
|Jun 12, 1980
|align=left| Hilton Chicago, Chicago, Illinois, U.S.
|align=left|
|-
|Win
|16–0
|align=left| Walter Santemore
|UD
|10
|May 15, 1980
|align=left| Aragon Ballroom, Chicago, Illinois, U.S.
|align=left|
|-
|Win
|15–0
|align=left| Frank Schram
|TKO
|2
|Apr 17, 1980
|align=left| Aragon Ballroom, Chicago, Illinois, U.S.
|align=left|
|-
|Win
|14–0
|align=left| Ron Stander
|TKO
|7
|Mar 3, 1980
|align=left| International Amphitheatre, Chicago, Illinois, U.S.
|align=left|
|-
|Win
|13–0
|align=left| Roy Wallace
|UD
|10
|Feb 1, 1980
|align=left| International Amphitheatre, Chicago, Illinois, U.S.
|align=left|
|-
|Win
|12–0
|align=left| Al Jones
|KO
|4
|Dec 13, 1979
|align=left| Tulsa Civic Center, Tulsa, Oklahoma, U.S.
|align=left|
|-
|Win
|11–0
|align=left| Harry Terrell
|KO
|1
|Nov 20, 1979
|align=left| Circle Arena, Chicago, Illinois, U.S.
|align=left|
|-
|Win
|10–0
|align=left| Bob Whaley
|TKO
|1
|Oct 19, 1979
|align=left| Chicago, Illinois, U.S.
|align=left|
|-
|Win
|9–0
|align=left| Jimmy Cross
|TKO
|2
|Sep 7, 1979
|align=left| Circle Arena, Chicago, Illinois, U.S.
|align=left|
|-
|Win
|8–0
|align=left| Charles Anderson Atlas
|TKO
|2
|Jul 30, 1979
|align=left| International Amphitheatre, Chicago, Illinois, U.S.
|align=left|
|-
|Win
|7–0
|align=left| Henry Porter
|TKO
|6
|Jul 20, 1979
|align=left| University of Illinois at Chicago, Chicago, Illinois, U.S.
|align=left|
|-
|Win
|6–0
|align=left| George Gofarth
|TKO
|5
|Jun 11, 1979
|align=left| Aragon Ballroom, Chicago, Illinois, U.S.
|align=left|
|-
|Win
|5–0
|align=left|Rocky Lane
|KO
|1
|Mar 31, 1979
|align=left| Chicago, Illinois, U.S.
|align=left|
|-
|Win
|4–0
|align=left| Sylvester Wilder
|TKO
|3
|Feb 28, 1979
|align=left| DePaul University, Chicago, Illinois, U.S.
|align=left|
|-
|Win
|3–0
|align=left| Dave Watkins
|KO
|1
|Feb 2, 1979
|align=left| Aragon Ballroom, Chicago, Illinois, U.S.
|align=left|
|-
|Win
|2–0
|align=left| Al Bell
|TKO
|1
|Dec 15, 1978
|align=left| Aragon Ballroom, Chicago, Illinois, U.S.
|align=left|
|-
|Win
|1–0
|align=left| Ron Stephany
|KO
|1
|Nov 18, 1978
|align=left| Alumni Hall, Chicago, Illinois, U.S.
|align=left|
|}

Exhibition boxing record

Life after boxing
In retirement he wrote an autobiography, Thinkin Big: The Story of James Quick Tillis, the Fightin' Cowboy.

James Tillis received catBOX Entertainment, Inc.’s Lifetime Sports Achievement Award.  Tillis, whose fighting prowess named him  “quick” and “the fighting cowboy”, was honored with the catBOX Entertainment, Inc.’s Lifetime Sports Achievement Award, before the main event at catBOX’s professional fight card set for February 11, 2010 at Remington Park Casino in Oklahoma City, Oklahoma.

On February 12, 2010, the State of Oklahoma honored one of its favorite sons, James “Quick” Tillis of Tulsa. Gov. Brad Henry signed a declaration making Feb 12 James “Quick” Tillis Day in Oklahoma.

As of 2010 Tillis is living in Tulsa.

His daughter Iciss played basketball at Duke University as a center, and was on the United States National Team for the 2003 Pan American Games.  Iciss was later selected in the first round by the Detroit Shock during 2004 WNBA Draft.  She later played for the New York Liberty in 2006.

Honorary Sign

On September 22, 2017 Tillis was honored by the city of Tulsa with honorary signs renaming a section of E. Virgin St "Quick Tillis Way" from N. Garrison Ave – N. Frankfort Ave.

Rochester Boxing Hall of Fame induction

On November 5, 2011, James "Quick" Tillis was Inducted into the Rochester Boxing Hall of Fame, receiving the "John Mastrella Integrity Award".

Tillis places the priorities in his life as "Serving The Lord Jesus Christ, Cowboy-ing and volunteering with amateur boxing clubs".

Bringing to fruition film adaptation of his autobiography, Thinkin Big: The Story of James Quick Tillis, the Fightin' Cowboy, is his pet project.

References

 http://www.catboxentertainment.com/catboxaward.html
 https://web.archive.org/web/20120421154020/http://www.tulsabeacon.com/?p=3684
 http://www.ringsideboxingshow.com/RingsideBoxingShowPage.html
 http://www.powerpunchers.net/WEBPROTECT%2Dfighterinterviews.htm
 https://web.archive.org/web/20120418180032/http://www.eastsideboxing.com/news.php?p=7622&more=1
 http://poststar.com/sports/article_3d5b9d82-ad9a-11df-963b-001cc4c002e0.html
 http://www.boxingscene.com/james-quick-tillis-memories-near-miss-kid--32419
 https://web.archive.org/web/20160304081756/http://thesecondimpact.com/uploads/boxing_hof_press_release.pdf
 http://www.tulsaworld.com/sportsextra/article.aspx?subjectid=29&articleid=20111113_29_B10_CUTLIN155558
 http://www.sportofboxing.com/a-comparison-of-master-plans-david-haye-vs-james-quick-tillis/
 http://www.ustream.tv/recorded/18973998
 http://www.fighthype.com/pages/content11742.html

External links
 

1957 births
Living people
Boxers from Oklahoma
Sportspeople from Tulsa, Oklahoma
American male boxers
Heavyweight boxers